Jiří Fiřt (born 1 August 1972) is a Czech gymnast. He competed at the 1996 Summer Olympics. He is now a coach of artistic gymnastics.

References

External links
 

1972 births
Living people
Czech male artistic gymnasts
Olympic gymnasts of the Czech Republic
Gymnasts at the 1996 Summer Olympics
Gymnasts from Prague